St. Ignatius may refer to:

People
 Ignatius of Antioch (c. 35 or 50 – between 98 and 117), third Patriarch of Antioch, considered a saint by the Roman Catholic and Orthodox Churches
 Ignatius of Loyola (1491–1556), founder of the Society of Jesus, considered a saint by the Roman Catholic Church
 Patriarch Ignatius of Constantinople (c. 797–877), Patriarch of Constantinople, considered a saint by the Roman Catholic and Eastern Orthodox Churches
 Ignatius of Laconi (1701–1781), Capuchin friar, canonized in 1951, considered a saint by the Roman Catholic Church
 Ignatius Brianchaninov (1807–1867), considered a saint by the Eastern Orthodox church

Places
St. Ignatius, Guyana, South America
St. Ignatius, Montana, US
St. Ignatius (White Oak), a Catholic parish in Ohio, US
St. Ignatius Hospital, Washington, US

See also
 St. Ignatius Church (disambiguation)
 Saint Ignatius College (disambiguation)
 St. Ignatius High School (disambiguation)
 St. Ignatius Catholic School (disambiguation)